Mario Cvitanović (born 6 May 1975) is a Croatian professional football manager and former player who played as a defender. He was most recently the manager of Croatian Football League club HNK Šibenik.

Playing career

Club
In 1995, Cvitanović started his career in the Croatian capital, where he won five consecutive national championships with Dinamo Zagreb (formerly Croatia Zagreb). He then spent four seasons in the Italian league, playing for Hellas Verona, Venezia, Genoa and Napoli before moving to Belgian side Germinal Beerschot. Following two seasons in the Belgian league, Cvitanović re-joined Dinamo for their 2006–07 Champions League campaign, before leaving after their early exit on a free transfer to German side Energie Cottbus. Cvitanović played three seasons with Cottbus until being released in 2009.

International
He made his debut for Croatia in an October 1998 European Championship qualification match away against Malta, coming on as a 88th-minute substitute for Robert Jarni, and earned a total of 9 caps, scoring no goals. His final international was a March 2001 World Cup qualification match against Latvia.

Coaching career

Dinamo Zagreb (2015–2018)
From 2015 to 2017, after succeeding Ivaylo Petev as a manager, he trained Dinamo Zagreb II, second team of Dinamo Zagreb, in the Croatian Second Football League. On 13 July 2017 he signed one-year contract as a head coach of Dinamo Zagreb, the first team. On 21 September 2017, Cvitanović was severely beaten by two masked assailants in front of his apartment in Zagreb, Croatia, while on 10 March 2018 he finished his contract with Dinamo Zagreb following two successive defeats from fierce rivals HNK Rijeka and feeder-club NK Lokomotiva, both of which were by a score of 4–1.

Al-Wehda (2019)
On 2 July 2019, he was appointed the new manager of the Pro League club Al-Wehda.

In September 2022, Cvitanović was appointed manager of Šibenik, replacing Damir Čanadi, but only to be replaced by the same Damir Čanadi on 31 January 2023.

Honours

Club
Beerschot A.C.
 Belgian Cup: 2004–05

References

External links
 
Croatian Football Federation: Statistics – Mario Cvitanović

1975 births
Living people
Footballers from Zagreb
Association football defenders
Croatian footballers
Croatia international footballers
GNK Dinamo Zagreb players
Hellas Verona F.C. players
Venezia F.C. players
Genoa C.F.C. players
S.S.C. Napoli players
Beerschot A.C. players
FC Energie Cottbus players
Bundesliga players
Serie A players
Serie B players
Croatian Football League players
Belgian Pro League players
Croatian expatriate footballers
Expatriate footballers in Italy
Croatian expatriate sportspeople in Italy
Expatriate footballers in Belgium
Croatian expatriate sportspeople in Belgium
Expatriate footballers in Germany
Croatian expatriate sportspeople in Germany
Croatian football managers
GNK Dinamo Zagreb managers
Al-Wehda Club (Mecca) managers
HNK Šibenik managers
Saudi Professional League managers
Croatian expatriate football managers
Expatriate football managers in Saudi Arabia
Croatian expatriate sportspeople in Saudi Arabia